The David Kenney House is a historic house at 67 Summer Street in Stoneham, Massachusetts.  Built c. 1850, the two-story wood-frame structure is a well-preserved worker's cottage, with a side-gable roof and a single interior chimney.  Only one room deep, it has three irregularly placed windows on both the first and second floors, and an off-center front entry.  It was listed as belonging to a laborer named David Kenney between 1858 and 1889.  Its scrolled front entrance hood is probably a later addition.

The house was listed on the National Register of Historic Places in 1984.

See also
National Register of Historic Places listings in Stoneham, Massachusetts
National Register of Historic Places listings in Middlesex County, Massachusetts

References

Houses on the National Register of Historic Places in Stoneham, Massachusetts
Houses in Stoneham, Massachusetts